Tulendeena is a rural locality in the local government area (LGA) of Dorset in the North-east LGA region of Tasmania. The 2016 census recorded a population of 12 for the state suburb of Tulendeena.

History 
Tulendeena was gazetted as a locality in 1967. The name is believed to be an Aboriginal word for “top”. The name was in use by 1917.

Geography
The boundaries consist primarily of survey lines and ridge lines.

Road infrastructure 
Route A3 (Tasman Highway) passes through from north-west to south-east.

References

Towns in Tasmania
Localities of Dorset Council (Australia)